Cristóbal Halffter Jiménez-Encina (24 March 1930 – 23 May 2021) was a Spanish classical composer. He was the nephew of two other composers, Rodolfo and Ernesto Halffter and is regarded as the most important Spanish composer of the generation of composers designated the Generación del 51.

Early years
Halffter was born in Madrid, but in 1936 the family moved to Velbert, Germany, to escape the Spanish Civil War. They returned to Madrid in 1939, and Halftter studied with Conrado del Campo at the Madrid Royal Conservatory, graduating in 1951. He continued his studies, outside of his university education, with Alexandre Tansman and André Jolivet in Paris.

Career
In 1955, Halffter was appointed conductor of the Falla orchestra. He forged a successful career as composer and conductor, writing music which combined a traditional Spanish element with avant-garde techniques. His neoclassical Piano Concerto (1953) won the National Music Prize in 1954. In 1961 he became Professor of Composition at the Royal Conservatory of Madrid, where he became Director in 1964 but remained only until 1966.

During the 1960s and 1970s, Halffter composed a number of works relating to human rights, including the 1968 choral work Yes, speak out, yes. In 1984 he served on the jury of the Paloma O'Shea International Piano Competition. He was awarded Spain's highest award for composition, the Premio Nacional de Música, in 1989. Also he has received the 2009 BBVA Foundation Frontiers of Knowledge Award in Contemporary Music.

Halffter's works include the opera Don Quijote (2000). His second opera, Lazarus, was premiered in 2008 at the Kiel Opera House to celebrate its centenary. A third opera, Schachnovelle, with a libretto by Wolfgang Haendeler after the eponymous novel by Stefan Zweig, was scheduled to premiere at the same house in May 2013.

Personal life and death
He was married to pianist María Manuela Caro until her death on 18 December 2017, with whom he had two sons and a daughter.

He died peacefully on 23 May 2021, at the age of 91, in Villafranca del Bierzo, province of León.

Selected works 

 Concerto for piano and orchestra (1953)
 String Quartet no. 1 (1955)
 Tres piezas, for string quartet (1956)
 Introducción, fuga y finale, for piano (1957)
 Codex I for guitar (1963)
 Líneas y puntos, for 20 wind instruments and electroacoustics (1966)
 Anillos, for orchestra (1966)
 Cantata Symposium (1966)
 Yes, speak out, yes, cantata (1966)
 Líneas y puntos, for 20 wind instruments and tape (1967)
 Noche pasiva del sentido, for soprano, two percussionists and 4 tape recorders (1970)
 String Quartet no. 2 "Mémoires" (1970)
 Llanto por las víctimas de la violencia, for chamber group and electroacoustics (1971)
 Platero y yo, for choir, soloists, and narrator, based on the poem by Juan Ramón Jiménez (1974)
 Cello Concerto no. 1 (1974)
 Elegía de la muerte de tres poetas españoles (1975)
 Variaciones sobre la resonancia de un grito, for 11 instruments, tape, and live electronics (1976–77)
 String Quartet no. 3 (1978)
 Officium defunctorum, for orchestra and chorus (1979)
 Violin Concerto no. 1 (1979)
 Fantasia sobre una sonoridad de G. F. Haendel, for string orchestra (1981)
 Ricercare, for organ (1981)
 Versus (1983)
 Paráfrasis, for orchestra (1984)
 Cello Concerto no. 2 ("No queda más que el silencio") (1985)
 Tiento del primer tono y batalla imperial, for large orchestra (1986)
 Piano Concerto (1987–88)
 Fandango, for cello octet (1989)
 Fractal, for saxophone quartet (1990)
 Violin Concerto no. 2 (1990–91)
 Preludio para Madrid '92, for chorus and orchestra (1991)
 Siete cantos de España (1992)
 Veni Creator Spiritus, for mixed choir, ensemble choir, 12 brass instruments, and percussion (1992)
 Daliniana, for orchestra (1994)
 Don Quijote, opera (2000)
 Attendite, for cello octet (2003)
 String Quartet no. 7 Espacio de silencio (2007)
 Concerto for viola and orchestra (2014)
 Alucinaciones (Hallucinations), Collage for viola, cello, and double bass (trio basso) with orchestra (2015)

References

Sources

Further reading

 . "Traditionsmomente in Kompositionen von Cristóbal Halffter, Klaus Huber und Wolfgang Rihm". In Die neue Musik und die Tradition. Sieben Kongress-Beiträge und eine analytische Studie, edited by Reinhold Brinkmann, 130–152. Mainz: Schott.
 Boulez, Pierre, Josef Häusler, and Cristóbal Halffter. 1985. Uber Répons: ein Interview mit Josef Häusler; Cristóbal Halffter: Variationen über das Echo eines Schreis: eine Analyse. Kassel: Bärenreiter. .
 Briner, Andres. 1986. "Menschlichkeit und Gewalt: Zum Werk von Cristóbal Halffter". In Komponisten des 20. Jahrhunderts in der Paul Sacher Stiftung, edited by Jörg Meyer Jans, 393–400. Basel: Paul Sacher Stiftung.
 Casares Rodicio, Emilio. 1980. Cristóbal Halffter. Colección Ethos-Música 3. Oviedo: Departamento de Arte-Musicología, Servicio de Publicaciones, Universidad de Oviedo. .
 Charles Soler, Agustín. 1992. "La universalidad de un lenguaje, confrontación de dos obras: Debla y Preludio para Madrid 92 de Cristóbal Halffter". Nassarre: Revista Aragonesa de Musicología 8, no. 1:9–64.
 Charles Soler, Agustín. 2002. Análisis de la música española del siglo XX: En torno a la Generación del 51. Valencia: Rivera.
 Hermann Danuser. 1986. "Cristóbal Halffter: Ein Komponist engagierter Musik". Dissonanz, no. 10.
 Danuser, Hermann. 1987. "Cristóbal Halffter: Un ejemplo de la nueva música comprometida", translated by Bernardo Martínez. In España en la música de occidente, 2 vols., edited by José López-Calo, Emilio Casares Rodicio, and Ismael Fernández de la Cuesta, 2: 475–477. Madrid: Ministerio de Cultura. .
 Daschner, Hubert. 1993. "Líneas y puntos von Cristóbal Halffter: Voraussetzungen, Entstehung, Folgen". In Quellenstudien. II: Zwölf Komponisten des 20. Jahrhunderts, edited by Felix Meyer, 149–168. Veröffentlichungen der Paul Sacher Stiftung, no. 3. Winterthur: Amadeus-Verlag. .
 Daschner, Hubert. 2000. Spanische Musik auf der Höhe ihrer Zeit: Cristóbal Halffter. Saarbrücken: Pfau-Verlag. .
 Daschner, Hubert. 2001. "Cristóbal Halffter und die Spanische Musik nach dem Zweiten Weltkrieg". In An den Rändern Europas: Ein internationales Festival mit Musik des 20. Jahrhunderts—Konzerthaus, Kunstforum, Musikverein, Odeon, WUK Kulturabteilung: 31. Oktober bis 30. November 1998, edited by Marie-Therese Rudolph and Berno Odo Polzer, Saarbrücken: Pfau-Verlag. .
 . 2000. "Ein spanischer Weltbürger: Der Komponist Cristóbal Halffter". In Wien Modern: 27. Oktober bis 26. November 2000 – Elektronik, Raum, 'musique spectrale' – Ein Festival mit Musik unserer Zeit, edited by Berno Odo Polzer, translations by Elfi Cagale, Silva Manfrè, and Martin Kaltenecker, 137–140. Saarbrücken: Pfau-Verlag. .
 Fernández-Cid, Antonio. 1984. "Cristóbal Halffter y Antón García Abril". Ritmo, no. 541:28.
 Halffter, Cristóbal. 1977. Cristobal Halffter. Zodiaque. Cahiers de l'atelier du Cam Ministry, ue 111. St. Liger Vanbau, Abbaji Sainte Marie de la Premequi-vore.
 Gan Quesada, Germán. 2003. "La obra de Cristóbal Halffter: Creación musical y fundamentos estéticos". PhD diss., Universidad de Granada.
 Gan Quesada, Germán. 2007. "Tópico folklórico, tradición e innovación en un ballet 'español': Jugando al toro de Cristóbal Halffter". Revista de Musicología 30, no. 1 (June) 181–206.
 . 1974. "Spanien rückt ins Blickfeld". Melos: Jahrbuch für zeitgenössische Musik 41, no. 5 (September–October): 271–277.
 Hochradner, Thomas. 2001. "Transformationen: Cristóbal Halffter und der Gedanke der Apokalypse". In Apokalypse: Symposion 1999, edited by Carmen Ottner, 296–311. Studien zu Franz Schmidt 13. Vienna: Doblinger. .
 Kassel, Matthias. 1998. "Cristóbal Halffter: Variation[en] über das Thema eSACHERe (1975) ". In Settling New Scores: Music Manuscripts from the Paul Sacher Foundation, edited by Felix Meyer, foreword by Charles E. Pierce Jr. and Paul Sacher, 223–225. Mainz: Schott. .
 Lewin-Richter, Andrés. 1985. "La música electroacústica a Catalunya". Revista Musical Catalana, 6 (April): 27–29.
 Mâche, François-Bernard. 1978. "Les mal entendus. Compositeurs des années 70". La Revue musicale, nos. 314–315:166.
 Marco, Tomás. 1972. Cristóbal Halffter. Madrid: Servicio de Publicaciones del Ministerio de Educación y Ciencia.
 Medina Álvarez, Ángel. 1996. "Apuntes sobre la recepción de la música abierta en España". Anuario musical: Revista de Musicología del C.S.I.C.  51:217–232.
 Mosch, Ulrich. 1991. "Vom Neoklassizismus zur Avantgarde: Cristóbal Halffters Weg zur Neuen Musik". Neue Zürcher Zeitung 212, no. 231 (5–6 October): 69–70.
 Oehrlein, Josef. 1982. "Kettenklirren für die Freiheit. Musik versus Diktatur: Der spanische Komponist Cristóbal Halffter". Musik und Medizin 2:61–68.
 Reverter, Arturo. 1987. "Cristóbal Halfter habla de sus Tres poemas de lírica española". Scherzo: Revista de Música, no. 12 (February): 78–79.
 Rodríguez, María del Mar. 1993. "Entrevista sobre educación musical con...Cristóbal Halffter: Los conservatorios no pueden estar anclados en el pasado". Música y educación: Revista trimestral de pedagogía musical 6, no. 1 (April): 9–14.
 Romero, Ernesto. 2002. "Le Quichotte de Cristóbal Halffter: Texte et partition au service d'une nouvelle quête indentitaire". In Textuel. 41 (2002): Texte et partition, edited by Julia Kristeva with an introduction Arthur Thomassin, 185–199. Paris: Université de Paris VII [Denis Diderot].
 Ros, Enrique A. 1991. "'Kultur ist Beunruhigung': Der spanische Komponist Cristóbal Halffter". Neue Zeitschrift für Musik 152, no. 6 (June): 36–41.
 Sagastume, Manu. 1996. "La Generación del 51". Kantuz, no. 32 (July–August): 27.
 Ulm, Renate. 1995. "Cristóbal Halffter: Tradition ist das, was von der Kultur einer Zeit übriggeblieben ist". In Eine Sprache der Gegenwart: Musica Viva 1945–1995, edited by Renate Ulm, 325–331. Mainz: Schott.  (cloth);  (pbk).
 Vega Toscano, Ana Maria. 1989. "Cristóbal Halffter: Un luchador en mil fuentes". Ritmo, no. 600 (June): 12–13.

External links 
 Cristóbal Halffter, biography and works, Universal Edition
 Cristóbal Halffter at Naxos Records
 

1930 births
2021 deaths
Musicians from Madrid
Spanish classical composers
Spanish male classical composers
Spanish people of German descent
20th-century classical composers
21st-century classical composers
Spanish opera composers
Male opera composers
Madrid Royal Conservatory alumni
Academic staff of the Madrid Royal Conservatory
Members of the Academy of Arts, Berlin
Members of the European Academy of Sciences and Arts
20th-century Spanish musicians
20th-century Spanish male musicians
21st-century male musicians